is a Japanese speed skater. He competed at the 1972 Winter Olympics and the 1976 Winter Olympics.

References

1948 births
Living people
Japanese male speed skaters
Olympic speed skaters of Japan
Speed skaters at the 1972 Winter Olympics
Speed skaters at the 1976 Winter Olympics
Sportspeople from Hokkaido